Semi-Soet is an Afrikaans-language romantic comedy directed by Joshua Rous. It stars Anel Alexander and Nico Panagio and was released on 17 February 2012.

Cast
 Anel Alexander as Jaci van Jaarsveld
 Corine du Toit as Denise Marais
 Paul du Toit (actor) as Markus Rossouw
 Wikus du Toit as Josie
 Nico Panagio as JP Basson
 Sandra Vaughn as Karla Jordaan
 Louw Venter as Hertjie Greyling

Plot
Workaholic Jaci van Jaarsveld (Alexander) will do everything in her power to ensure that the advertising company she works for is not taken over by Amalgamated Media, a corporate giant run by businessman JP Basson (Panagio), who is referred to as the "Jackal" on account of his ruthless business tactics. Her only hope is to secure a valuable contract with Vrede en Lust, a Cape wine estate wanting to enter into the international market. However, the winegrower makes it clear that the person who is to market his wines must conform to the family ideals of his company, and thus be in a stable romantic relationship. Out of desperation, Jaci decides to hire a model to act as her fiancé during a meeting with the winegrower, only to have him invite her and her "fiancé" to his estate in the Cape Winelands, where she will have to compete with a rival company, led by her ex-fiancé, to secure the contract. Just as Jaci starts to feel as if she is in control of the situation, she discovers that her feigned fiancé is actually the very same "Jackal" whom she was trying to prevent from taking over the company she works for.

References

Afrikaans-language films
2012 films
2012 romantic comedy films
South African romantic comedy films